The Main road 15 (formerly main road 150) is a south–north direction First class main road in the Kisalföld, that connects the Main road 1 change to the border of Slovakia. Most of the traffic was taken over by the M15 motorway.

The road, as well as all other main roads in Hungary, is managed and maintained by Magyar Közút, state owned company.

See also

 Roads in Hungary

Sources

External links

 Hungarian Public Road Non-Profit Ltd. (Magyar Közút Nonprofit Zrt.)
 National Infrastructure Developer Ltd.

Main roads in Hungary
Győr-Moson-Sopron County